Turnbull Peak is a peak rising to  at the head of Hernandez Valley in the Apocalypse Peaks of Victoria Land in Antarctica. Named by the New Zealand Geographic Board (NZGB) (2005) after Ian Turnbull, an Institute of Geology and Nuclear Sciences geologist, who was a member of geology mapping parties at Asgard Range, Victoria Valley, Saint Johns Range, and at the Mackay Glacier and Wilson Piedmont Glacier areas in several field seasons 1988–89 to 1997–98.

References

Mountains of Victoria Land